Mary Carryl (Unknown22 November 1809) was an Irish-born loyal servant and friend of the celebrated Ladies of Llangollen. She served them up to her death; and when the Ladies died, they shared the same grave.

Life
Carryl was brought up in a poor family in Ross in County Wexford. Little is known about her until she was employed by Lady Elizabeth "Betty" and Sir William Fownes at the Woodstock Estate. His grandfather had left William Fownes over 21,000 acres. William Fownes' father, (also) Sir William Fownes, had been the Mayor of Dublin. When her employer had married Elizabeth Ponsonby he had received £4,000 as a dowry. With this money they built the six-bayed, three-storey Woodstock House in County Kilkenny in 1745-7. Her employers had a child guest named Sarah Ponsonby, who was Elizabeth's cousin. When Sarah's adult friend, Lady Eleanor Butler, ran away from home, she was hidden in Sarah's room and Mary smuggled in food for her stowaway.

The friendship between Lady Eleanor Butler and Sarah Ponsonby was not approved of by the Fownes or by Eleanor's guardians. When the friendship began, Sarah was an unhappy thirteen year old orphan and she was captivated by the well-educated Eleanor Butler, a 30 year old spinster who was no longer considered marriageable. Sarah was receiving unwanted attention from Sir William. Eventually Butler and Ponsonby agreed that they could leave Ireland together. They went to Llangollen in Wales where they set up home in a cottage called Plas Newydd. Meanwhile Mary, who was known as Mary the Bruiser had been fired after throwing a candlestick which wounded another servant. She was saved when Eleanor and Sarah sent for her to come to Llangollen.

In time Eleanor and Sarah would become notorious as "The Ladies of Llangollen", meanwhile Carryl became both their servant and the head of the household. She was loyal to her employers. She was said to have "masculine qualities" and Lady Eleanor's diary records how she would give as good as she got as she bargained loudly with the fishermen, the butchers and the inebriated.

The lifestyle of the Ladies of Llangollen attracted attention. They would receive notable visitors including the Duke of Wellington; the poets William Wordsworth and Anna Seward, enlightenment leaders Erasmus Darwin and Josiah Wedgewood and writers including Sir Walter Scott.

Carryl died in Plas Newydd in 1809 and was buried in the churchyard of St Collen’s Church, Llangollen. She left a shilling to her brother and sister, but she left the field she owned to Sarah. In time the Ladies of Llangollen would die and they were buried beside their faithful servant.

The memorial monument to Mary Carryl, Eleanor Butler and Sarah Ponsonby in the churchyard of St. Collen's Church was erected in 1810. The inscription on Mary Carryl's part of the monument reads: "In Memory of/ Mrs Mary Carryl/ Deceased 22 November 1809/ This monument is erected by Eleanor Butler,/ and Sarah Ponsonby, of Plasnewydd in this Parish./ Released from Earth and all its transient woes,/ She whose remains beneath this stone repose,/ Stedfast in Faith resigned her parting breath,/ Looked up with Christian joy, and smiled in Death!/ Patient, Industrious, Faithful, Generous, Kind,/ Her Conduct left the proudest far behind,/ Her Virtues dignified her humble birth,/ And raised her mind above this sordid earth,/ Attachment (Sacred bond of grateful breasts)/ Extinguished but with life, this Tomb attests,/ Reared by Two Friends who will her loss bemoan,/ 'Till with Her Ashes...Here shall rest, Their own."

References

1809 deaths
People from County Kilkenny
Servants